The Calder Memorial Trophy is an annual award given "to the player selected as the most proficient in his first year of competition in the National Hockey League (NHL)." It is named after Frank Calder, the first president of the NHL. Serving as the NHL's Rookie of the Year award, this version of the trophy has been awarded since its creation for the 1936–37 NHL season. The voting is conducted by members of the Professional Hockey Writers' Association at the conclusion of each regular season to determine the winner.

History 

The Calder Memorial Trophy is named in honour of Frank Calder, the former president of the National Hockey League (NHL) from its inception in 1917 to his death in 1943. Although Rookie of the Year honors were handed out beginning in 1932–33, the Calder Trophy was first presented at the conclusion of the 1936–37 NHL season. After Calder's death in 1943 the trophy was renamed the Calder Memorial Trophy.

In 1991, goaltender Ed Belfour won the Calder, having previously appeared in 32 games with the Chicago Blackhawks over the 1988–89 and 1989–90 seasons. Belfour was eligible for the award because nine of those appearances came during the 1990 Stanley Cup playoffs, and the other 23 appearances were made during the 1988–89 season. The nine playoff games did not count towards the regular season eligibility requirements.

The trophy has been won the most times by rookies from the Toronto Maple Leafs, who have won it on ten occasions, with the most recent being Auston Matthews in 2017. 

The voting is conducted at the end of the regular season by members of the Professional Hockey Writers' Association, and each individual voter ranks their top five candidates on a 10–7–5–3–1 points system. Three finalists are named and the trophy is awarded at the NHL Awards ceremony after the playoffs.

Winners

See also
List of National Hockey League awards
List of NHL players
List of NHL statistical leaders

References
Calder Trophy history at NHL.com
Calder Trophy profile at Legends of Hockey.net

National Hockey League trophies and awards
Awards established in 1933
Rookie player awards